David W. E. Willis,  is a linguist and Celticist. In 2020 he took up the post of Jesus Professor of Celtic at the University of Oxford. He had previously held posts in historical linguistics at the University of Manchester and at the University of Cambridge, where he was a Fellow of Selwyn College.

In 2022, he was elected a Fellow of the British Academy (FBA), the United Kingdom's national academy for the humanities and social sciences.

Research
His research is in the areas of language change and syntax, with particular reference to the Celtic and Slavic languages as well as to English. The synchronic and diachronic syntax of Welsh has been a particular focus: his first book was on the loss of verb-second in the history of Welsh, and he has co-authored a textbook on the syntax of the present-day language. He is also an expert in the syntax of negation and on Jespersen's cycle cross-linguistically.

Selected publications
 Willis, David. 1998. Syntactic change in Welsh: A study of the loss of verb-second. Oxford: Oxford University Press. 
 Willis, David. 2000. On the distribution of resumptive pronouns and wh-trace in Welsh. Journal of Linguistics 36(3), 531–573.
 Borsley, Robert, Maggie Tallerman, and David Willis. 2007. The syntax of Welsh. Cambridge: Cambridge University Press. 
 Willis, David. 2007. Syntactic lexicalization as a new type of degrammaticalization. Linguistics 45(2), 271–310.
 Breitbarth, Anne, Christopher Lucas, Sheila Watts, and David Willis (eds.). 2009. Continuity and change in grammar. Amsterdam: John Benjamins. 
 Willis, David, Christopher Lucas, and Anne Breitbarth (eds.). 2013. The history of negation in the languages of Europe and the Mediterranean, Volume I: Case studies. Oxford: Oxford University Press. 
 Breitbarth, Anne, David Willis, and Christopher Lucas (eds.). 2020. The history of negation in the languages of Europe and the Mediterranean, Volume II: Patterns and processes. Oxford: Oxford University Press.

References

Linguists from the United Kingdom
Fellows of Jesus College, Oxford
Celtic studies scholars
Jesus Professors of Celtic
Welsh-speaking academics
Living people

Year of birth missing (living people)